Allium melanantherum is a species of plant in the amaryllis family and is native to Bulgaria, Greece, Montenegro, Slovenia, Bosnia and Herzegovina, Serbia, North Macedonia and Croatia.

References 

melanantherum
Flora of Bulgaria
Flora of Greece
Flora of Montenegro
Flora of Croatia
Flora of Slovenia
Flora of Bosnia and Herzegovina
Flora of Serbia
Flora of North Macedonia